Ehtuish Farag Ehtuish (1 April 1953) is a Libyan Surgeon, prof. of Surgery and politician. He served as the minister of health and was among the first team to develop the laparoscopic surgery Hepato-pancreatico- Billiary Surgery and organ transplant in Libya.

Ehtuish is currently chairman of Tripoli Central Hospital’s department of surgery

Early life and family
Ehtuish grew up in a political family, His eldest uncle was a member of the house of representatives. His younger uncle was the Libyan ambassador to several countries such as Spain and Iraq. His grandfather was a tribal sheikh.

Ehtuish married on 16 September 1982. Has five children: Two sons, three daughters. All five children went to medical schools.

Education
He did well in school, graduating from high school by the age of 17. Ehtuish studied medicine at University of Benghazi where he obtained his medical diploma in 1979. Ehtuish  received his M.Sc. in 1986, Ph. D  in 1988, S.Spec. in 1988 from the University of Zagreb.

Medical career
 
Ehtuish began his career as a surgeon in 1979 at the Tripoli Central Hospital. Later he became the Director of the Tripoli Central Hospital from 1982 to 1983.

He served as the President of University of Tripoli at which time he banned university professors from giving private lessons with payments thus that all students can only study in the university for free. Ehtuish wrote free medical sheets where he had become an admired professor of surgery.

He was the Director of Medical and Drug Research Centre from 1990 to 1999.

Organ Transplant
Ehtuish developed Organ transplant in 2003 when he established the National Transplant Program and served as Director from 2003 up to present. He has performed over 650 organ transplants. The program has a high rate of success with 95% of those receiving transplants surviving beyond the first year.

Medical Books

Principles of General Surgery 
Liver Transplant
Kidney Transplant
Ethics of Organ Transplants

Political career

Ehtuish's most notable positions :
The Minister of Health.

See also

List of Libyans
Transplant surgeons

References
1.http://www.cofs.org/libya.htm Drs. Ehtuish and Budiani meet with team to plan study on concepts of deceased donation in Libya.

2.Al jazeera, Yousef al qaradawi- Dr. Ehtuish ehtuish- Organ transplant in Islam http://www.aljazeera.net/channel/archive/archive?ArchiveId=1093846

3.

External links
 http://www.abc.ly/Advisory Ehtuish Ehtuish
 البرنامج الوطني لزراعة الاعضاء و اخلاقيات المهنة http://www.irassa.com/modules/publisher/item.php?itemid=75
   ليبيا تحقق نتاىْج هامة في زراعة الكلي  http://www.arabnet5.com/news.asp?c=2&id=12222

1953 births
Living people
Libyan politicians
Health ministers of Libya
University of Benghazi alumni
School of Medicine, University of Zagreb alumni
Libyan transplant surgeons